Rescue is a Christian a cappella quartet of musical performers operating out of Gresham, OR.  The group started as a quartet in 1997 consisting of Jason Overstreet, Jason McKenney, Chad Krober, and Matt Lusk and released their first album in 1999.  Tim Storms, who set a Guinness World Record for the lowest note produced by a human in 2000, was a member of the group from 2001 until 2004.  Currently, Overstreet is the only original member of the group.  Overstreet continues to write, arrange and produce the group's repertoire and albums.

Discography
 Rescue (1999)
 2000 Years Ago (1999)
 The First Christmas (2001)
 The Difference (2003)
 Reunion Live (2004) (also available as a DVD)
 Before the Throne (2008)
 Beautiful [a single] (2009)
 InDependence [an EP] (2010)
 Beautiful [full album] (2015)
 He Is Born [an EP] (2016)

Current members
 Jason Overstreet (Baritone/Vocal Percussion)
 Brian Sell (Lead/Tenor)
  Kovy Aguiar (Bass)
 Tyler Luecke (Tenor/Lead)
 Josh Reznick (Tenor/Lead)

Former members
 Matt Lusk
 Josh McKenney
 Chad Krober
 Jason Pearce
 Tim Storms
 Mitch Fewell
 Josh Wheeler
 Luke Coles
 Dustin Allen
 Brandon Bell
 Chris Benjamin
 Kris Strobeck
 Jason "Jay" McKenny
 Steve "Teeb" Cross

Footnotes

External links
Official website

Professional a cappella groups
American Christian musical groups
Gresham, Oregon
Musical groups from Oregon
1997 establishments in Oregon
Musical groups established in 1997